Matheson may refer to:

People
Matheson (surname)
Clan Matheson, Scottish clan of that name
Matheson baronets, two baronetcies in the Baronetage of the United Kingdom
Matheson family, a political family in Utah, USA
Matheson Bayley, a British entertainer
Matheson Lang, a Canadian actor and playwright

Companies
Matheson (automobile), defunct US automobile manufacturer
Matheson (compressed gas & equipment), manufacturer of industrial, specialty, and electronics gases
Matheson (law firm), Ireland's largest corporate tax law firm
Matheson & Company, London correspondents for Jardine Matheson Holdings

Places

Canada

Manitoba
Matheson Island, Manitoba, a community in Canada
Matheson Island Airport, Manitoba, Canada

Ontario
Matheson, Ontario, a town in Canada
Matheson Fire, a 1916 forest fire
Matheson railway station, Black River-Matheson, Ontario, Canada
Matheson House (Perth), a historic house in Perth, Ontario, Canada
Matheson Boulevard, a boulevard in Toronto

Saskatchewan
Matheson Lake, a lake in Meadow Lake Provincial Park, Saskatchewan

United States

Florida
Matheson Hammock Park, Miami, Florida, USA
Matheson Museum, a history museum in Gainesville, Florida, USA
Matheson House (Gainesville, Florida), a historic building

Other states
Matheson, Colorado, an unincorporated town
Matheson Junior High School, in Magna, Utah

Other places
Lake Matheson, New Zealand
Matheson Glacier, Antarctica

See also
Mathesons Bay
Matthiessen